Concrete was one of three factory towns around the present-day Holcim plant in eastern Fremont County, Colorado, United States. The other two are Portland and Cement. All three are located south of Penrose, Colorado and east of Florence, Colorado along State Highway 120.

The town was founded in 1905. Its elevation is

References

Unincorporated communities in Fremont County, Colorado